Love Will Tear Us Apart is a 1999 Hong Kong drama film written and directed by Yu Lik-wai, produced by and starring Tony Leung Ka-fai. It was entered into the 1999 Cannes Film Festival.

Cast
 Tony Leung Ka-fai as Jian
 Wong Ning as Yin
 Lü Liping as Yan
 Rolf Chow as Chun
 Simon Chung as Man in subway
 Gorretti Mak as Woman in elevator

References

External links

1999 films
1999 drama films
1990s Cantonese-language films
Hong Kong drama films
Films directed by Yu Lik-wai
Films set in Hong Kong
Films shot in Hong Kong
Films about prostitution in Hong Kong
1990s Hong Kong films